The FIA Electric GT Championship (abbreviated as eGT) is a planned sports car racing series for electric grand tourers sanctioned by the Fédération Internationale de l'Automobile (FIA). It was announced with the inaugural season expected to begin in 2023.

History

The championship was announced to the public on May 6, 2021, following the reveal of the FIA's new Electric GT category for electric-powered grand tourer racing cars. The technical regulations of the new category were unveiled to the World Motor Sport Council by FIA GT Commission President Leena Gade in December 2020, with invitations to tender for the roles of promoter and battery cell supplier having been launched earlier that autumn. Together with the public announcement of the championship, Discovery was presented as the appointed worldwide promoter.

Format
The series will race at full-length permanent circuits. A minimum of six events across Europe, the Middle East and Asia are planned for the inaugural season, expanding into the USA the following year. Each event will consist of a qualifying sprint race on Saturday followed by a 45-minute main race on Sunday. The main race will feature at least one mandatory fast-charging pit stop.

The FIA has also announced plans to integrate an element of esports into the series.

Technical regulations
The regulations of the new category have been created to match the performance of current GT3 cars, with many technologies being carried over from the GT3 regulations to keep costs low; for instance, minimum weight is planned to be  to limit the use of expensive materials. Manufacturers will also be permitted to fit an electric powertrain to an existing GT3 model. Having originally been limited by a minimum selling price for the road-going models that the race cars are to be derived from, this limitation was later removed.

The cars will be limited to a power output of 430 kW, though manufacturers may use either two or four electric motors in a rear-wheel-drive or all-wheel-drive configuration. Torque vectoring will also be permitted to aid performance.

Every manufacturer will use lithium-ion battery cells in pouch format supplied by Saft to build their own battery packs with customised layouts. The batteries will have a maximum energy capacity of 87 kWh and recharge at a rate of up to 700 kW, which will replenish 60% of their capacity in "a few minutes", according to the FIA. On race days, a 45-minute charging interval will occur at a standard rate of approximately 350 kW between hour-long practice, qualifying, and competition rounds, with fast charging limited to three or four minute intervals.

Entries

For the first two seasons of the series, the FIA has aimed at a minimum of fourteen full-season entries divided across seven teams with two cars each. From 2025 onwards, this will rise to a minimum of twenty entries divided across ten teams. The championship will also feature a minimum of two manufacturers, rising to a minimum of four from 2025. The first confirmed entry, team and manufacturer has yet to be announced.

Reception by manufacturers
Markus Flasch of BMW M said in June 2021 that the company is "very interested" in the Electric GT Championship. BMW's Head of Motorsport Mike Krack later stated that he considers the timeline as "very ambitious", but that the company is seriously looking at the new series.

In August 2021 it was revealed that Bentley and RML Group had begun development on an electric test car based on the Bentley Continental GT3 and compatible with the FIA's Electric GT technical regulations. However, Bentley's Director of Motorsport Paul Williams stressed that no decision had been made on whether or not the company would enter the championship, adding that "If there was a fully electric endurance option that is where we would probably be."

General Motors also expressed interest in the new championship that same month, with sports car racing program manager Laura Klauser saying she considers the Electric GT Championship "one of the more intriguing" new series the company is evaluating for the future.

In January 2022, Subaru revealed the all-electric STI E-RA concept race car. The car is built to the specifications of the FIA's Electric GT technical regulations, though no announcement on a championship entry has been made.

Head of Audi Sport customer racing Chris Reinke said in May 2022 that Audi "eventually, for sure" could enter the Electric GT Championship, after previously stating the company is keeping an eye on electric championship developments in the GT segment.

See also
 Electric motorsport
 FIA ETCR – eTouring Car World Cup

References

External links
 Fédération Internationale de l'Automobile

Electric GT
Fédération Internationale de l'Automobile
Sports car racing series
Electric vehicles
Green racing